Mokhovoye is a rural locality in Baninsky Selsoviet Rural Settlement, Fatezhsky District, Kursk Oblast, Russia. The population as of 2010 is 22.

Geography 
The village is located on the Gnilovodchik River (a link tributary of the Usozha in the basin of the Svapa) and its tributary, Mokhovoy Brook, 109 km from the Russia–Ukraine border, 46 km north-west of Kursk, 5 km north-east of the district center – the town Fatezh, 5 km from the selsoviet center – Chermoshnoy.

Climate
Mokhovoye has a warm-summer humid continental climate (Dfb in the Köppen climate classification).

Transport 
Mokhovoye is located 6 km from the federal route  Crimea Highway as part of the European route E105, 5.5 km from the road of regional importance  (Fatezh – Dmitriyev), 2 km from the road of intermunicipal significance  (M2 "Crimea Highway" – 1st Banino), 25 km from the nearest railway station Vozy (railway line Oryol – Kursk).

The rural locality is situated 47 km from Kursk Vostochny Airport, 169 km from Belgorod International Airport and 229 km from Voronezh Peter the Great Airport.

References

Notes

Sources

Rural localities in Fatezhsky District